Benjamin Oliveira FRS FSA (1806 – 28 September 1865) of Hyde Park Street, London was a British Whig politician.

He was the son of Dominick Oliveira, a London merchant of Portuguese descent and spent much of his early life in Portugal. He then moved, by now well-to-do, to live in Hyde Park Street, London, where he took an interest in the development of railways, wrote a book about his travels and joined the Whig political party.

Oliveira was first elected Whig MP for Pontefract in 1852, but was defeated at the next election in 1857.

He was a member of the council of the Society of Arts and was elected a Fellow of the Royal Society in 1835.

He died at his London home in 1865.

References

External links
 

Whig (British political party) MPs for English constituencies
UK MPs 1857–1859
Fellows of the Royal Society
1806 births
1865 deaths